Montaldo Torinese is a comune (municipality) in the Metropolitan City of Turin in the Italian region Piedmont, located about  east of Turin.

Montaldo Torinese borders the following municipalities: Gassino Torinese, Sciolze, Marentino, Pavarolo, Chieri, and Andezeno.

References

Cities and towns in Piedmont